Live in Japan is the second live album by Glen Campbell. This album was released in 1975 which is only in Japan. On January 24, 2012, Live in Japan finally saw a domestic CD release, through Real Gone Music.

Track listing
Side 1:
 "Intro/I Believe in Music" (Mac Davis) – 2:52
 "Galveston" (Jimmy Webb) – 2:28
 "It's Only Make Believe" (Conway Twitty, Jack Nance) – 2:22
 "Lovelight" (Bill C. Graham) – 2:56
 "I Honestly Love You" (Peter Allen, Jeff Barry) – 3:35
 "Annie's Song" (John Denver) – 3:46

Side 2:
 "Song for Y'all" (Carl Jackson) – 3:30
 "Comin' Home (To Meet My Brother)" (Bill Backer, Rod McBrien, Billy Davis) – 4:20
 "Try to Remember/The Way We Were" (Harvey Schmidt, Tom Jones, Marvin Hamlisch, Alan Bergman, Marilyn Bergman) – 7:32
 "Hits Medley" (Jimmy Webb, John Hartford, Bobby Austin, Curt Sapaugh) – 8:53
 "By The Time I Get To Phoenix"
 "Wichita Lineman"
 "Try a Little Kindness"
 "Honey Come Back"
 "Gentle on My Mind"
 "My Way" (Paul Anka, Claude François, Giles Thibaut, Jacques Revaux) – 2:36
 "William Tell Overture" (Gioachino Rossini) – 4:58
 "Amazing Grace" (John Newton) – 4:34

Personnel
Glen Campbell – vocals, acoustic guitar
Bob Felts – drums
Billy Graham – bass guitar
Carl Jackson – harmony vocals, acoustic guitar, electric guitar, banjo, fiddle
Dennis McCarthy – piano
The "Coming Home Orchestra"

1975 live albums
Glen Campbell live albums
Capitol Records live albums